Sabina Ajrula Toziya (17 April 1946 – 10 August 2021) was a Macedonian-Turkish actress best known for playing Hayriye Çakırbeyli in crime-drama series Eşkıya Dünyaya Hükümdar Olmaz and Afife Hatun in Muhteşem Yüzyıl.

Life and career 
Toziya was born on 17 April 1946 in Skopje, Macedonia, Yugoslavia, which is now within the borders of North Macedonia. She studied acting at the Skopje State Theatre. After acting in Macedonia and Yugoslavia, Toziya played the character of Afife Hatun in the TV series Magnificent Century, which was broadcast on Star TV for the first time in Turkey. She played the role of Hayriye Çakırbeyli in the TV series Eşkıya Dünyaya Hükümdar Olmaz. She left the show in January 2021 after suffering a partial stroke due to a brain tumor.

Death 
On 10 August 2021, Toziya died at the age of 75, after suffering a stroke due to a tumor in her brain.

Filmography

Films 
 Times Without War (1969)
 Itrata vdovica (1969)
 Vetar vo kutice kibrit (1970)
 Zedj (1969) - Nikolina
 Precek (1971) - Julka
 Dobra Dolina (1973)
 Misery (1975)
 Stand Up Straight, Delfina (1977) - Neda Korkut
 Beliot Sid (1978)
 Vreme, vodi (1980) - Kjuskoica
 The Lead Brigade (1980) - Vera
 The Red Horse (1981)
 Juzna Pateka (1982)
 Opasni trag (1984) - Bolnicarka
 Jazol (1985) 
 Bolva v'uvo (1991) - Sandebis
 Tattoo (1991)
 Vreme, zivot (1992)
 Angels of the Dumps (1995) - Rabotninckata
 Na balkanot ne se pie caj (1998)
 Today, Tomorrow (1998) - Mother
 Kontakt (2005) - Neighbour Woman
 Krcma na patot kon Evropa (2005) - Sultanaa
 Shadows (2005) - Dr. Vera Perkova
 The Little Gypsy Witch (2011) - Baba Ilonka
 Materijal za audicija (2013) - Silva
 Honey Night (2015) - Cveta
 Amok (2016) - Mother
 My Mother's Wound (2016) - Mevlide
 Bal Kaymak (2018) - Havva
 Vera (2019) - Vera
 Aman Reis Duymasin (2019) - Mother
 Escape To The Sea (2021) - Anka
 M (2022)

Television 
 Solunski patrdii (1986) - Fatime
 Sluski od zivotot (1987) Mother
 Makedonski narodni prikazni (1994)
 Salon Harmoni (1998) - Grozda
 Nase maalo (2002) - Vesterka
 Makedonski narodni prikazni 2 (2012-2015)
 Magnificent Century (2012–2014) - Afife Hatun
 Familijata Markovski (2017–2019) - Milica
 Zoki Poki (2020) - Zoki Poki Grandmother / Narrator
 Eskiya Dünyaya Hükümdar Olmaz (2015–2021) - Hayriye Çakirbeyli

References 

1946 births
2021 deaths
20th-century Macedonian artists
Turkish film actresses
Turkish television actresses
Macedonian people of Turkish descent
Turkish people of Macedonian descent
Deaths from brain cancer in North Macedonia
People from Skopje